This is a list of proposed states and union territories in India. The constitutional power to create new states and union territories in India is solely reserved with the Parliament of India. It can do so by announcing new states/union territories, separating territory from an existing state or merging two or more states/union territories or parts of them. In addition to the existing 28 states and 8 union territories, several new states and union territories have been proposed.

The Indian constitution (under Part I: The Union and its territory) allows certain provisions for the creation of new states and union territories:

 Name and territory of the union.
 Admission or establishment of new states.
 Formation of new States and alteration of areas, boundaries or names of other existing states.
 Laws made under articles 2 and 3 to provide for the amendment of the First and the Fourth Schedules and supplemental, incidental and consequential matters.

However, at the same time, demanding separate statehood within under the administration of Indian union from an existing state can lead to criminal charges under secession law in India.
Between late 1956 and early 2014, members and leaders of various respected ethnic/linguistic organizations, in various separate statehood movements like Telangana movement in Andhra Pradesh, Bodoland movement in Assam, Punjabi Suba movement in East Punjab, Gorkhaland movement in West Bengal, Greater Tipra land in Tripura, et cetera, have been arrested, detained and "encountered" by police under IPC section 124A by the order of Government of India for demanding and asking for a separate state from the existing one. For instance:
 During the Gorkhaland movement in the late 1986-88, around 1,200 people were killed/encountered by police and dozens were arrested.
 The Punjabi Suba movement, which sought a separate Punjabi-speaking state, saw as many 200 deaths during 1955 Golden Temple raid and 57,129 arrests by police. 
 During the Bodoland Movement, around 5,000 people have been "encountered" by Assam police and 20,000 jailed since 1967.
 In 1966, Indira Gandhi's government bombed Mizoram's capital Aizawl, causing thousands of deaths, because they were asking for a separate state.
 During separate Karbi Land demand in Assam, many people have been "encountered" and jailed for asking for a separate state.

History
Before independence, India was divided into British-administered provinces and nominally autonomous princely states, which were governed by the British administration. After the partition of India, some of these administrative divisions became part of the Dominion of Pakistan, whilst the remaining states and provinces formed the Dominion of India. The colonial system of administration continued until 1956 when the States Reorganisation Act abolished the provinces and princely states in favour of new states which were based on language and ethnicity.

Several new states and union territories have been created out of the existing states since 1956. The Bombay Reorganisation Act split the Bombay State into the present-day states of Gujarat and Maharashtra on 1 May 1960 on a linguistic basis. The state of Nagaland was created on 1 December 1963. The Punjab Reorganisation Act, 1966 carved out a new Hindi-speaking state of Haryana from the southern districts of Punjab state, transferred the northern districts to Himachal Pradesh and designated a union territory around Chandigarh, the shared capital of Punjab and Haryana.

Statehood was conferred upon Himachal Pradesh on 25 January 1971, and upon Manipur, Meghalaya and Tripura on 21 January 1972. The Kingdom of Sikkim joined the Indian Union as a state on 26 April 1975. In 1987, Arunachal Pradesh and Mizoram became states on 20 February, followed by Goa on 30 May of the same year. Goa's northern exclaves of Daman and Diu became a separate union territory.

Three new states were created in November 2000: Chhattisgarh (1 November) was created out of eastern Madhya Pradesh; Uttaranchal (9 November), which was later renamed Uttarakhand, was created out of the mountainous districts of northwest Uttar Pradesh; and Jharkhand (15 November) was created out of the southern districts of Bihar.

On 2 June 2014, Telangana was separated from Andhra Pradesh as the 29th state of the union. On 31 October 2019, the state of Jammu and Kashmir was split into two new Union Territories: Jammu and Kashmir and Ladakh. On 26 January 2020, the Union Territory of Daman and Diu and the Union Territory of Dadra and Nagar Haveli were merged into one Union Territory: the Union Territory of Dadra and Nagar Haveli and Daman and Diu.

India may have 50 states in the near future if all statehood demands are conceded.

Table of all proposed States

Andhra Pradesh

Rayalaseema
This proposed state would consist of eight districts, namely Kurnool, Nandyal, Anantapur, Sri Sathya Sai, Kadapa, Annamayya, Tirupati, and Chittoor. Rayalaseema Parirakshana Samithi is a political party formed by Byreddy Rajasekhar Reddy in 2013 advocating for a separate Rayalaseema state. There have also been demands to include the two coastal districts of Prakasam and Nellore district to form Greater Rayalaseema.

Assam

Bodoland
The agitation for the creation of a separate Bodoland state resulted in an agreement between the Indian Government, the Assam state government, and the Bodo Liberation Tigers Force. According to the agreement made on 10 February 2003, the Bodoland Territorial Council, an entity subordinate to the government of Assam, was created to govern four districts covering 3,082 Bodo Kachari-majority villages in Assam. Elections to the council were held on 13 May 2003, and Hagrama Mohilary was sworn in as the chief of the 46-member council on 4 June.

Karbi Anglong
Karbi Anglong is one of the 35 districts of Assam. Several memoranda for a Karbi homeland have been submitted at multiple times by several organisations over the years. The demand for a separate state turned violent on 31 July 2013 when student demonstrators set government buildings on fire.

Dimaraji
The Dimasa people of northeast India have been demanding a separate state called Dimaraji or "Dimaland" for several decades. It would comprise the Dimasa-Kachari inhabited areas in Assam, namely the Dima Hasao district, Cachar district, Karimganj district, Hailakandi district, Karbi Anglong district, and parts of Hojai district, together with part of the Dimapur district in Nagaland.

Barak State

The native Bengali people of Assam have demanded a separate state for themselves within the Barak Valley, particularly the Bengali majority districts of Cachar, Hailakandi, and Karimganj. Some definitions also include Dima Hasao and Hojai. Silchar would be the capital of the proposed state.

Bihar

Bhojpur
There have been demands for a Bhojpur state, comprising the Bhojpuri speaking districts of western Bihar and eastern Uttar Pradesh.

Mithila

Mithila is a proposed state which would cover the Maithili speaking regions of Bihar and Jharkhand. There is no consensus on the capital, although Begusarai, Darbhanga, Muzaffarpur, and Purnia have all been suggested as candidate cities.

Delhi

The political administration of Delhi more closely resembles that of a state than a union territory, with its own legislature, high court, and an executive council of ministers headed by a Chief Minister. New Delhi is jointly administered by the union government and the local government of Delhi. The previous National Democratic Alliance government introduced a bill in Parliament in 2003, to grant full statehood to Delhi, however the legislation was not passed.

Gujarat

Bhil Pradesh
The establishment of Bhil Pradesh has been a demand for over 30 years. The Daily News and Analysis reported in 2013 that the formation of the Telangana state has reignited hopes of statehood to this region, comprising the tribal-dominated parts of Gujarat and neighbouring states Madhya Pradesh, Rajasthan, and Maharashtra.

Kutch
Kutch State or Cutch State, covering the Kutch district of Gujarat, the Great Rann of Kutch, and the Little Rann of Kutch, is an aspirant, both as an independent state and as part of a combined Saurashtra, also known as Kathiawar. Both Saurashtra State and Kutch State existed as separate states from 1947 to 1956. They were Part-B and Part-C states of India respectively. They were merged with Bombay state following the States Re-organisation Act, and became part of Gujarat after the bifurcation of Bombay state on 1 May 1960 following the Mahagujarat Movement. Some people demand a return of statehood to Saurashtra and Kutch, citing slow development of the regions. Apart from these two separate statehood demands, there is a demand for a separate Bhilistan state.

At the time of the integration of the princely state of Kutch with India in 1947, the accession was done on the condition that Kutch would retain the status of a separate state. It enjoyed this status until 1960, when a separate state of Gujarat was carved out of Maharashtra and Kutch was merged with it. The main reason behind a separate state is cultural and geographical distance from Gandhinagar. In 1960, Kutch was promised an autonomous development board under Article 371(2) of the Constitution, which never came into existence due to lack of political will. Additionally, water from the Narmada does not reach the farms of this region.

Saurashtra
The movement for a separate Saurashtra state was initiated in 1972 by advocate Ratilal Tanna, who was a close aide of former Prime Minister Morarji Desai. As per the Saurashtra Sankalan Samiti, more than 300 organisations across the Saurashtra region support the demand of the separate State. The Samiti also claims that compared to other parts of Gujarat, Saurashtra is underdeveloped. Lack of better water supply to the region, lack of job opportunities, and subsequent youth migration have been cited as major reasons for the demand of statehood. Saurashtra is linguistically different from the rest of the state due to the prevalence of its Saurashtra dialect.

Jammu and Kashmir

Jammu state and Kashmir state
Ethnic Kashmiri leaders, including writer and opinion leader Ghulam Nabi Khayal, have called for the division of Jammu and Kashmir into separate states as a possible solution to the Kashmir conflict. The proposed state of Kashmir comprises the Kashmir Division, and the proposed state of Jammu comprises the Jammu Division. Demographically, the Jammu region is very different from the Kashmir valley. It is primarily inhabited by Dogras, Gujjars, and Sikhs who speak the Dogri, Gojri, Punjabi languages.

In late 2020, IkkJutt Jammu was launched as a party and demanded that the Jammu Division should be separated and given statehood. The party also supports splitting Kashmir Division into two union territories, with one for Kashmiri Hindus.

Panun Kashmir
Panun Kashmir is a proposed union territory in the Kashmir Valley on religious lines which is advocated by the Kashmiri Pandit Network as a homeland for Kashmiri Hindus who have fled the Kashmir valley as a result of ongoing separatist movement and hope to return.

Karnataka

Karu Nadu or North Karnataka
North Karnataka is a geographical region consisting of mostly semi-arid plateau from  elevation that constitutes the northern part of the Karnataka state in India. It is drained by the Krishna River and its tributaries, the Bhima, Ghataprabha, Malaprabha, and Tungabhadra. North Karnataka lies within the Deccan thorn scrub forests ecoregion, which extends north into eastern Maharashtra.

The proposed state of North Karnataka includes the districts of Bagalkot, Belagavi, Bellary, Bidar, Dharwad, Gadag, Haveri, Kalaburagi, Koppal, Raichur, Vijayanagar, Vijayapura, and Yadgir.

There is a notable difference from the regions of Old Mysore, Coastal Karnataka, and Central Karnataka in terms of language, cuisine and culture. The region is well known for its contributions to the literature, arts, architecture, economy and politics of Karnataka.

Kodagu
Kodagu is a district of Karnataka that is predominantly inhabited by Kodava people. The Codava National Council (CNC) wishes for it to be an "autonomous region".

Konkan
Konkan is a rugged section of the western coastline of India. It consists of the coastal districts of Maharashtra, Goa, and Karnataka. The ancient sapta-Konkan is a slightly larger region described in the Sahyadrikhanda, which refers to it as "Parashuramakshetra". The proposed Konkan state includes the districts of Ratnagiri and Sindhudurg from Maharashtra, the state of Goa, and Karwar up to Aghanashini in Karnataka.

Tulu Nadu
Tulu Nadu is a border region between the states of Karnataka and Kerala in southern India. The demand for a separate state is based on a distinct culture and language (Tulu, which does not have official status), and neglect of the region by the two state governments. To counter these complaints and accusations, the Karnataka and Kerala state governments created the Tulu Sahitya Academy to preserve and promote Tuluva culture. The proposed state would comprise the districts of Dakshina Kannada and Udupi from Karnataka, and the Kasaragod district from Kerala.

Ladakh  
After Revocation of the special status of Jammu and Kashmir, Ladakh was made Union Territory withput legislature like Andaman and Nicobar Islands.

Thereafter several demands has been raised from both Kargil and Leh district for statehood for Ladakh Union Territory.

Kargil Democratic Alliance and Leh Apex Body demanded statehood and rallied across areas of Leh and Kargil and also held rallies in Jammu and Delhi They threatened Central Government to intensify their protests before Ladakh local bodies elections and 2024 Lok Sabha Election.

Sonam Wangchuk a reformer from Ladakh demanded statehood and stood on 5 day hunger strike.

Madhya Pradesh
Madhya Pradesh is the second largest Indian state by area, holding nearly 9.37% of the country's land area and approximately 10% of its population. The regions of Madhya Pradesh are very ethno-linguistically diverse and often hold no connection to each other. Naturally, this has led to several proposals to divide the state into smaller states, each with homogeneous populations.

Baghelkhand, Bundelkhand and Vindhya Pradesh
Vindhya Pradesh was a former state of India. It occupied an area of 23,603 sq. miles. It was created in 1948, shortly after the independence of India, from the territories of the princely states in the eastern portion of the former Central India Agency. It was named after the Vindhya Range, which runs straight through the center of the province. The capital of the state was originally Singrauli, then Rewa. It lay between Uttar Pradesh to the north and Madhya Pradesh to the south, and the enclave of Datia, which lay a short distance to the west, was surrounded by the state of Madhya Bharat.

Vindhya Pradesh was merged into Madhya Pradesh in 1956, following the States Reorganisation Act. In 2000, Sriniwas Tiwari, ex-speaker of the Madhya Pradesh assembly, called for nine districts to be separated from Madhya Pradesh to create a new state of Vindhya Pradesh, although this was rejected by the Chief Minister of Madhya Pradesh. Separate states of Bundelkhand and Baghelkhand, instead of a single Vindhya Pradesh state, is advocated as well to accommodate for the districts claimed by these regions from the neighboring state of Uttar Pradesh.

Recently, the demand for a Bundelkhand state has been gaining popularity. Former Chief Minister of Madhya Pradesh Uma Bharti has assured people of the region to raise voice for a separate Bundelkhand state. Former Chief Minister of Uttar Pradesh Mayawati has also expressed her support for the establishment of the Bundelkhand state. The Bundelkhand state would consist of more than 16 districts, including Jhansi, Lalitpur, Urai, Jalon, Banda, Chitrakoot, Hamirpur, Mauranipur, Mahoba in Uttar Pradesh and Sagar, Damoh, Panna, Chhatarpur, Tikamgarh, Shivpuri, Datia, and some parts of Gwalior in Madhya Pradesh. More recently, a voice for the Bundelkhand state has been raised by Bundelkhand Mukti Morcha, a political party headed by Raja Bundela of Lalitpur.

Mahakoshal and Gondwana
Mahakoshal is a region which lies in the upper or eastern reaches of the Narmada River valley in the Indian state of Madhya Pradesh. The region includes the districts of Jabalpur, Chhindwara, Katni, Narsinghpur, Mandla, Dindori, and Seoni. The largest city and a possible capital is Jabalpur. Organisations such as Mahakaushal Mukti Morcha and Bharatiya Janashakti have demanded separate statehood for the region.

It is alleged that although the Mahakoshal region is rich in minerals, forests, water and land resources, related industries were set up in nearby states. The region has a distinct cultural identity owing to Jabalpur city, known as the Sanskardhani (cultural capital) of the State, one of the oldest towns of central India. Culturally and socially, the Mahakoshal region differs greatly from the neighbouring Vindhya Pradesh. One of the key reasons for this is said to be that large parts of Mahakoshal were under direct British rule from the nineteenth century onwards, turning it into a relatively progressive, modern and liberal area and infusing democratic values into its body politic. Casteism and feudalism are said to be not as deeply rooted in this region as they are in Vindhya Pradesh.

A parallel demand for a state of Gondwana from the same Mahakoshal region of Madhya Pradesh has arisen, owing to the fact that vast areas of Mahakoshal were ruled by Gondi kings and even today, Mandla, Chinndwara, Dindori, Seoni, and Balaghat have a predominantly Gondi tribal population. Tribes constitute 64% of the total population of the Dindori district and 57% of the Mandla district. The Gondwana Gantantra party (GGP) was established in 1991, with the objective to struggle for the creation of a separate Gondwana State comprising regions that were ruled by Gondis. The Gondwana Gantantra party (GGP) has since divided into numerous factions, such as the Rashtriya Gondwana party and Gondwana Mukti Dal.

Malwa
There have been demands for a separate Malwa state with the probable capital at Indore. The region includes the Madhya Pradesh districts of Agar Malwa, Dewas, Dhar, Indore, Jhabua, Mandsaur, Neemuch, Rajgarh, Ratlam, Shajapur, Ujjain, and parts of Guna and Sehore, and the Rajasthan districts of Jhalawar and parts of Banswara and Pratapgarh.

The main language of Malwa is Malvi, although Hindi is widely spoken in the cities. The language is sometimes referred to as Malavi or Ujjaini. Malvi is part of the Rajasthani branch of languages; Nimadi is spoken in the Nimar region of Madhya Pradesh and in Rajasthan. The dialects of Malvi are, in alphabetical order, Bachadi, Bhoyari, Dholewari, Hoshangabadi, Jamral, Katiyai, Malvi Proper, Patvi, Rangari, Rangri and Sondwari. A survey in 2001 found only four dialects: Ujjaini (in the districts of Ujjain, Indore, Dewas and Sehore), Rajawari (Ratlam, Mandsaur and Neemuch), Umadwari (Rajgarh) and Sondhwari (Jhalawar, in Rajasthan). About 55% of the population of Malwa can converse in and about 40% of the population is literate in Hindi, the official language of the Madhya Pradesh state.

Rewakhand
An initiative has been started by MP High Court Bar council with a demand of a new state of "Rewakhand" from the eastern half of the state combining all the regions of Vindhya Pradesh, Bundelkhand, Baghelkhand and Mahakoshal.

Maharashtra

Konkan
The Konkan region is a section of land along the north-western coast of India and the north Western Ghats. Konkan lies in between the Deccan plateau and the Arabian Sea. It consists of the westernmost districts of Daman, Maharashtra, and Goa. The ancient sapta-Konkan is a slightly larger region described in the Sahyadrikhanda, which refers to it as "Parashuramakshetra". The proposed Konkan state includes the historically Konkani speaking districts of the Konkan division, the former untion territory of Goa, Daman and Diu, and a portion of the Carwar district.

Marathwada
Marathwada is one of the five divisions of Maharashtra. The region coincides with the Aurangabad Division of Maharashtra. Marathwada came under the rule of the Nizam of Hyderabad, which later became the princely state of Hyderabad, under the suzerainty of British India. Subsequently, through Operation Polo, a "police action" on 17 September 1948, the Indian army annexed Hyderabad to India and on 1 November 1956, Marathwada was formed by merging Hyderabad State and Bombay State. On 1 May 1960, Bombay State was divided into the states of Maharashtra and Gujarat, with Marathwada becoming a part of the former. There have been demands for a separate Marathwaada state.

Vidarbha

Vidarbha is a region that comprises the Amravati and Nagpur divisions of eastern Maharashtra. The State Reorganisation Act of 1956 placed Vidarbha in Bombay State. Shortly after this, the States Reorganisation Commission recommended the creation of Vidarbha state with Nagpur as the capital, but instead it was included in Maharashtra state, which was formed on 1 May 1960. Support for a separate Vidarbha state had been expressed by Loknayak Bapuji Aney and Brajlal Biyani. The demands for the creation of a separate state are based on allegations of neglect by the Maharashtra state government. Jambuwantrao Dhote led a popular struggle for Vidarbha statehood in the 1970s. Two politicians, N. K. P. Salve and Vasant Sathe, have led attempts to bring about statehood in recent times.

The BJP supported the Vidarbha statehood demand and it won 44 out of the 62 seats in Vidarbha region in the 2014 Maharashtra Legislative assembly election, receiving a majority in the Maharashtra Legislative assembly. However, BJP didn't create a separate state after winning the election. In the following 2019 legislative assembly election, BJP was defeated, only winning 29 seats.

Meghalaya

Garoland
Garo Hills Autonomous District Council (GHADC) is seated at Tura and is one of the three Autonomous District Councils within Meghalaya state, and one of fourteen autonomous regions of India. The region of Garoland covers the districts of East Garo Hills, West Garo Hills, South Garo Hills, North Garo Hills, and Southwest Garo Hills.

The Garo National Council is a political party in Meghalaya in northeastern India. Founded by Clifford R. Marak, the party fights for the creation of a Garo-majority state, to be carved from the districts of West Garo Hills, East Garo Hills, and South Garo Hills. The Garoland demand of GNC is different from that of the separatist guerrilla Achik National Volunteer Council, who alos demands that parts of Assam ought to be part of Garoland.

GNC won one seat in the Garo Hills Autonomous District Council elections in 2002.

In the 2003 Meghalaya state assembly elections, GNC had put up seven candidates, who together received 8,483 votes.
Clifford Marak, the only GNC MLA in the state legislature, died on 1 March 2015 of liver and kidney disease.

Khasi-Jaintia Hills state 
HSPDP a regional political party which is also part of Conrad Sangma led MDA has demanded to bifurcate state into two states, Garo hills and Khasi-Jaintia Hills. However the another ally of MDA, UDP has not supported the demand by saying that the bifurcation of state would create problems.

Mizoram

Chakmaland

Chakmaland is a proposed union territory for the predominantly Buddhist Chakma people in western Mizoram, which came under Indian territory from the Chittagong Hill Tracts after the Partition of India. Chakmas have been demanding to convert the existing Chakma Autonomous District Council and areas of Tlabung in Mizoram into a union territory. The Chakma people have faced discrimination by the predominantly Christian Mizo people.

Nagaland

Frontier Nagaland

An organisation named Eastern Nagaland People's Organization(ENPO) has called separate state for frontier districts (Longleng, Mon, Tuensang, Noklak, Shamtor and Kiphire) ahead of 2023 Nagaland Legislative Assembly election. They also called for boycott of upcoming state election. These region comprises 20 state assembly seats.

These region of Nagaland is inhibited by tribes of Konyak, Khiamniungan, Chang, Sangtam, Tikhir, Phom and Yimkhiung.

During British era, this region was under Tuensang Frontier earlier was part of North-East Frontier Agency(Later to Assam state until 1957).

Odisha

Kosal 

The Kosal state movement is an effort by people of the Western Odisha region to secede from the state of Odisha.[when?][citation needed] Organizations like Western Odisha Yuva Manch (WOYM), Kosal Youth Coordination Committee (KYCC), Kosal State Coordination Committee (KSCC), KOSHAL SENA are mainly leading this.

The demand for secession from the state of Odisha arose mostly because of the prolonged underdevelopment and backwardness of this region. Pro-separatist groups have repeatedly claimed the state government is not doing enough for the development of undeveloped districts of western Odisha.

To develop the western Odisha region, the state government has established a Western Odisha Development Council (WODC). A significant budget is allotted to this council from the total budget of Odisha. However, the WODC headquarters is located in the state capital Bhubaneswar rather than in Western Odisha.

Rajasthan

Maru Pradesh 

Maru Pradesh
 (मरुप्रदेश) is a proposed desert state in North West India, to be carved out from the state of Rajasthan. The proposed state consists of the Barmer district, Jaisalmer district, Bikaner district, Churu district, Ganganagar district, Hanumangarh district, Jhunjhunu district, Jodhpur district, Nagaur district, Pali district, Jalore district, Sirohi district, and Sikar district.

When the then Prime Minister Atal Bihari Vajpayee created three new states in the year 2000, Bhairon Singh Shekhawat  wrote a letter saying that for the development of the state of Rajasthan and the internal security of the country, two parts of the state were go done.

Tamil Nadu

Kongu Nadu

There is a demand by fringe elements for the formation of a Kongu Nadu state by bifurcating Tamil Nadu. In 2021 the Bharatiya Janata Party's (BJP) Coimbatore North district demanded separate statehood to Kongu Nadu. Kongunadu Munnetra Kazhagam party has supported the statehood demand. The DMK has opposed the move.

Tripura

Tipraland

Tipraland is the name of a proposed state in India. The formation of "Tipraland", a state within the TTAADC, under articles 2 and 3 of the Indian Constitution, is demanded by the Indigenous People's Front of Tripura (IPFT) as part of their political agenda. Another registered regional political party, Tipraland State Party (TSP) also demanded statehood for Tipraland.

The Kingdom of Tripura was a kingdom ruled by the Manikya Dynasty. Its first king was Maha Manikya, who ruled the kingdom in the early 15th century. The earlier kings are partly mythological and partly legendary or semi-legendary. The penultimate king was Maharaja Bir Bikram Kishore Debbarman Manikya Bahadur. After his death in 1947, the princely state of Tripura joined India as a Part C State on 15 October 1949 under the name Tripura, and later achieved statehood on 21 January 1972.

Historically, the rulers of Tripura's Manikya dynasty had always encouraged the immigration of and settlement of non-tribals to Tripura, especially Bengalis. Rajmala authenticates the fact that Ratna Manikya (1464-1468) was the first to "settle 4,000 Bengalis in four places" in Tripura. During  the Noakhali riots in 1946, many Bengali Hindu survivors were sheltered in temporary relief camps in Comilla, Chandpur, Agartala (the present capital of Tripura), and other places. A large migration of Bengali Hindus and Muslims took place in Assam, Meghalaya, Tripura, and other places during the Bangladesh Liberation War in 1971. The indigenous Tipra people demanded an autonomous district, which they finally achieved on 23 March 1979 in the form of the Tripura Tribal Areas Autonomous District Council (TTAADC).

Uttar Pradesh
At least four states have been proposed to be carved out of Uttar Pradesh.

Awadh Pradesh
The population of a proposed Awadh state, consisting of Awadhi speaking districts of central Uttar Pradesh, would be approximately 50 million people with an area of approximately 75,000 km2 and Lucknow as the capital.

Braj Pradesh and Harit Pradesh/Pashchim Pradesh

Harit Pradesh is a proposed state, which would comprise 22 districts of Western Uttar Pradesh, currently forming six divisions – Agra, Aligarh, Bareilly, Meerut, Moradabad, Saharanpur and some parts of the Kanpur Division, (Farrukhabad, Etawah and Auraiya districts). The most prominent advocate for the creation of the new state is Ajit Singh, the leader of the Rashtriya Lok Dal party. Mayawati also supported the formation of Harit Pradesh in December 2009.

There is another demand within the same region – Braj Pradesh, consisting of the Agra division, Aligarh division and some districts of the Kanpur division (Farrukhabad, Etawah and Auraiya) from Uttar Pradesh, and the districts of Bharatpur, Dholpur and Gwalior from Rajasthan and Madhya Pradesh. The proposed capital would be in Agra. So far, Braj has remained as a historical and cultural region, rather than a political entity. The language of Braj is Braj Bhasha.

Bundelkhand

Bundelkhand comprises parts of Uttar Pradesh and Madhya Pradesh. In 2011, the Bahujan Samaj Party government under Chief Minister Mayawati proposed the creation of Bundelkhand from seven districts of Uttar Pradesh, with Allahabad as the capital. Organisations such as Bundelkhand Mukti Morcha (BMM) also demanded its formulation, along with the inclusion of six other districts from Madhya Pradesh as well. Uma Bharati of the Bharatiya Janata Party promised a separate state of Bundelkhand within three years if her party was voted to power, during campaigning for the 2014 Loksabha Elections at Jhansi. A similar promise was made by Congress leader Pradeep Jain Aditya during these elections.

Since the early 1960s, there has been a movement for establishing a Bundelkhand state for promoting the development of the region. Bundelkhand is geographically in the central part of India, covering part of Madhya Pradesh and part of Uttar Pradesh. Despite being rich in minerals, the people of Bundelkhand are poor and the region is underdeveloped and underrepresented in state and central politics. Agrarian crisis and farmer's suicides are also cited as the reason for separate statehood.

Purvanchal

Purvanchal is a geographic region of north-central India, which comprises the eastern end of Uttar Pradesh state. It is bounded by Nepal to the north, Bihar state to the east, Baghelkhand region of Madhya Pradesh state to the south, the Awadh region of Uttar Pradesh to the west. Purvanchal comprises three divisions – Awadhi region in the west, Bhojpuri region in the east, and the Baghelkhand region in the south. The most commonly spoken language in Purvanchal is Bhojpuri. The area is represented by 23 Members of Parliament to the lower house of Indian Parliament, and 117 legislators in the 403 member Uttar Pradesh state assembly or Vidhan Sabha. The region includes the districts of Azamgarh, Ballia, Basti, Chandauli, Deoria, Ghazipur, Gorakhpur, Jaunpur, Kushinagar, Maharajganj, Mau, Mirzapur, Sant Kabir Nagar, Sant Ravidas Nagar, Siddharth Nagar, and Varanasi.

As a fallout of the movement for Telangana, then state chief minister Mayawati, proposed on 13 December 2009, to carve out a separate state of Purvanchal out of Uttar Pradesh, with Gorakhpur or Varanasi as its capital.

West Bengal

Gorkhaland

Gorkhaland is a proposed state covering areas inhabited by the ethnic Indian Gorkha people, namely the Darjeeling hills and the Dooars in the northern part of West Bengal. Nepali is spoken by 40% of the population of the Darjeeling district and 51% of the population of the Kalimpong district. The movement for Gorkhaland has gained momentum in the line of ethno-linguistic-cultural sentiment of the people who desire to identify themselves as Gorkha.

The demand for a separate administrative region has existed since 1907, when the Hillmen's Association of Darjeeling submitted a memorandum to the Morley-Minto reforms committee. After Indian independence, the Akhil Bharatiya Gorkha League (ABGL) was the first political party from the region to demand greater identity for the Gorkha ethnic group and economic freedom for the community. In 1980, the Pranta Parishad of Darjeeling wrote to the then Prime Minister of India, Indira Gandhi, with the need to form a state for the Gorkhas.

The movement for a separate state of Gorkhaland gained serious momentum during the 1980s, when a violent agitation was carried out by the Gorkha National Liberation Front (GNLF) led by Subhash Ghising. The agitation ultimately led to the establishment of a semiautonomous body in 1988 called the Darjeeling Gorkha Hill Council (DGHC) to govern certain areas of the Darjeeling district. However, in 2008, a new party called the Gorkha Janmukti Morcha (GJM) raised the demand for a separate state of Gorkhaland once again. In 2011, the GJM signed an agreement with the state and central governments for the formation of the Gorkhaland Territorial Administration, a semiautonomous body that replaced the DGHC in the Darjeeling hills. On 28 March 2022, Gorkha Janmukti Morcha permanently dropped its Gorkhaland statehood demand, instead seeking political solution within West Bengal.

Kamtapur

Kamtapur lies in the northern parts of West Bengal. The proposed state consists of the districts of Cooch Behar, Goalpara, Dhubri, South Salmara, Bongaigaon, Kamrup, and the southern plains of the Darjeeling district, including Siliguri city as well as Jalpaiguri.

Junglemahal State

In 2021, Saumitra Khan, Lok Sabha BJP MP advocated for the creation of a Junglemahal state by carving out Junglemahal area from West Bengal. He claimed that the Junglemahal area is underdeveloped and the demands of employment and development for locals could only be met if it gets statehood. The proposed Junglemahal state consists of Purulia, Jhargram, Bankura, parts of Birbhum, Purbo Medinipur, and Paschim Medinipur, along with some other areas. Currently 15 of the 40 MLAs from the Bankura, Purulia, West Midnapore and Jhargram are from BJP.

However, the West Bengal state BJP unit distanced itself from the demand. Following the Junglemahal statehood demand, a Trinamool congress leader filed Complaint against Saumitra Khan for demanding separate statehood.

North Bengal

In 2021, BJP MP John Barla demanded carving out a state or union territory comprising North Bengal districts out of the West Bengal state. The demand was supported by BJP MP Jayanta Roy, MLA Aanandamay Barman and MLA Sikha Chatterjee. The proposed Union Territory will comprise eight districts of North Bengal: Darjeeling, Kalimpong, Jalpaiguri, Alipurduar, Cooch Behar, Malda, Uttar Dinajpur, and Dakshin Dinajpur. Currently, 30 out of the 54 MLAs in the North Bengal are from the BJP.

The West Bengal state BJP unit distanced itself from the union territory/statehood demand. The West Bengal Congress president Adhir Ranjan Chowdhury said that this is a plot to carve out Muslim-dominated regions in the state and added that RSS is behind this move. A Trinamool congress leader filed a complaint against John Barla for demanding a separate state. However, North Bengal's different native linguistic ethnic groups like Bengalis, Nepalis, Adivasis, and Koch Rajbongshis have rejected the separate statehood demand and are against the division of West Bengal.

States with no separation movements                        
 Chhattisgarh 
 Goa   
 Haryana                                                                              
 Himachal Pradesh 
 Jharkhand
 Kerala 
 Puducherry                     
 Punjab                  
 Sikkim                   
 Telangana                     
 Uttarakhand

See also
Autonomous administrative divisions of India
Indian reunification
Greater India
Kashmir#Current status and political divisions

References

External links

https://www.indiatoday.in/india/north/story/india-50-states-demands-of-new-states-conceded-172769-2013-08-03

India politics-related lists
 
Lists of proposals